Marling is a surname. Notable people with the surname include:

Alfred Erskine Marling (1859–1935), President of the Chamber of Commerce of the State of New York
Brit Marling (born 1983), American actress, screenwriter and film producer
Charles Murray Marling (1863–1933), British diplomat
Laura Marling (born 1990), British singer
Percival Marling (1861–1936), British recipient of the Victoria Cross
Robert E. Marling, Jr., American banker
Samuel Marling (1810–1883), British cloth manufacturer